André Charles Prosper Messager (30 December 1853 – 24 February 1929) was a French composer, organist, pianist and conductor. His compositions include eight ballets and thirty opéras comiques, opérettes and other stage works, among which his ballet Les Deux Pigeons (1886) and opéra comique Véronique (1898) have had lasting success; Les P'tites Michu (1897) and Monsieur Beaucaire (1919) were also popular internationally.

Messager took up the piano as a small child and later studied composition with, among others, Camille Saint-Saëns and Gabriel Fauré. He became a major figure in the musical life of Paris and later London, both as a conductor and a composer. Many of his Parisian works were also produced in the West End and some on Broadway; the most successful had long runs and numerous international revivals. He wrote two operatic works in English, and his later output included musical comedies for Sacha Guitry and Yvonne Printemps.

As a conductor, Messager held prominent positions in Paris and London, at the head of the Opéra-Comique, the Paris Opéra, the Orchestre de la Société des Concerts du Conservatoire, and the Royal Opera House, Covent Garden. Although as a composer he is known chiefly for his light works, as a conductor he presented a wide range of operas, from Mozart to Richard Strauss, and he acquired a reputation as a conductor of Wagner. In Paris he conducted the world premieres of Debussy's Pelléas et Mélisande, Massenet's Grisélidis and Charpentier's Louise.  At Covent Garden, he gave the British premieres of operas by Saint-Saëns and Massenet.

Messager's music became known for its melodic and orchestral invention, musical craftsmanship, and characteristically French elegance and grace. Although most of his works have been infrequently revived, historians of music consider him the last major figure in French opéra comique and opérette.

Life and career

Early years

Messager was born at Montluçon in central France on 30 December 1853, the son of Paul-Philippe-Émile Messager, a prosperous local tax collector, and his wife Sophie-Cornélie, née Lhôte de Selancy. He recalled, "You would not find any musicians among my ancestors. When very young I learned the piano; but later on my intentions to become a composer met with such opposition from my father". At the age of seven he was sent as a boarder to a Marist school where he continued his interest in the piano.

Towards the end of the 1860s disastrous stock-market speculation brought Messager's family financial ruin and they could no longer afford to keep him at the Marist school. They dropped their objection to music as a profession, viewing a post as a church organist as a respectable and steady career. He was awarded a bursary to study at the École Niedermeyer in Paris, an academy known for its focus on church music. This was at the time of the Paris Commune (1871), and to escape the violence in the city the school was temporarily evacuated to Switzerland. Messager studied piano with Adam Lausset, organ with Clément Loret, and composition with Eugène Gigout, Gabriel Fauré and (after leaving Niedermeyer's school) Camille Saint-Saëns. The musicologist Jean-Michel Nectoux comments that after his studies Messager developed into one of the finest orchestrators of the period.

Fauré and Messager quickly moved from being master and pupil to being firm friends and occasional collaborators. In 1874 Messager succeeded Fauré as organiste du chœur (choir organist) at Saint-Sulpice, Paris, under the principal organist, Charles-Marie Widor. In 1876 he won the gold medal of the Société des Auteurs, Compositeurs et Editeurs de Musique with a symphony, the work being warmly received when performed by the Concerts Colonne at the Théâtre du Châtelet in January 1878. He won further prizes for his cantatas Don Juan et Haydée and Prométhée enchaîné.

In 1879 Fauré and Messager travelled to Cologne to see Wagner's Das Rheingold and Die Walküre, and later to Munich for the complete Ring cycle, Die Meistersinger von Nürnberg and Tannhäuser; in 1888 they went to Bayreuth for Die Meistersinger and Parsifal. They frequently performed as a party piece their joint composition, the irreverent Souvenirs de Bayreuth (c. 1888). This short, skittish piano work for four hands burlesques motifs from The Ring. The two composers had a more serious collaboration, their Messe des pêcheurs de Villerville (1881).

First successes

In 1878 Messager was appointed conductor at the Folies Bergère, and he began his career composing for the stage with two short ballets, Fleur d'oranger (1878) and Les Vins de France (1879). In 1880 a former manager of the Folies, M. Comy, was appointed to run the new Eden Théâtre in Brussels. At his invitation, Messager resigned from the Folies in 1880 and became conductor of the Eden. He returned to Paris in 1881 as organist of Saint-Paul-Saint-Louis church, and from 1882 to 1884 he was organist and choirmaster at Ste Marie-des-Batignolles, a small church in the north west of Paris, where his assistant was another young composer, Claude Terrasse.

Messager's career took a new turn in 1883 when the composer Firmin Bernicat died leaving an unfinished opérette, François les bas-bleus. Messager was invited to complete it; he orchestrated the entire work and composed between twelve and fifteen numbers. It was staged in November 1883 at the Théâtre des Folies-Dramatiques and was an immediate critical and popular success. It was later produced in London and New York. In 1883, while deputising for Saint-Saëns as the soloist at a concert in Le Havre, Messager met a young woman, Edith Clouette, whom he married in the same year. Fauré played the organ at the ceremony, and composed a mildly cynical song, "Madrigal", as a wedding present. There was one child of the marriage, Jean André Emile Charles (1886–1952).

In December 1883 Messager and Emmanuel Chabrier gave the first performance of the latter's Trois valses romantiques at the Société Nationale de Musique. The concert also included the premiere of the two-piano version of España, arranged by Messager. Messager and Chabrier were close friends until the latter's death in 1894. Both were known for their comic operas and opérettes, but Chabrier's one serious opera, Gwendoline, appealed strongly to Messager, who vowed to conduct it in Paris, which he later did. He also prepared a piano reduction of the orchestral parts for the vocal score of the work.

Following the success of François les bas-bleus Messager accepted simultaneous invitations to compose a ballet for the Opéra and an opérette for the Folies-Dramatiques. The opérette, La Fauvette du temple, first performed on 17 November 1885, confirmed Messager's early reputation. It ran well into the following year in Paris, and he was able to sell the British rights immediately, though the work was not staged in London until 1891. The ballet, Les Deux Pigeons, which became one of Messager's best known works, took longer to reach the stage. It was put into rehearsal at the Opéra, but the staging, which showed a tree being struck by lightning in a storm scene, was considered a fire hazard by the police, and the production was temporarily shelved.

A month after the opening of La Fauvette du temple the Bouffes-Parisiens premiered Messager's opéra comique La Béarnaise, with Jeanne Granier in the title role. It ran for three months and was successfully produced in Britain the following year with a cast including Florence St. John and Marie Tempest, running for more than 200 performances. The Times said of this production that it gave Messager a secure footing in London, which led to important results later in his career. A production of La Béarnaise in New York followed in 1887, under the title Jacquette.

In 1886 Les Deux Pigeons was finally produced at the Paris Opéra and was a box office triumph. It was Messager's last popular success for four years. His attempt at a more serious opera, Le Bourgeois de Calais (1888), was not well received. Richard Traubner remarks in Operetta: A Theatrical History on its "boring historical plot, bad lyrics, and a banal score"; a contemporary critic wrote, "That Le Bourgeois de Calais will have a successful career there is not the faintest chance, for all the patriotic bolstering in the world could not make it an attractive piece." Messager followed this with a musical fairy tale, Isoline (1888), which was slightly better received, and a three-act opérette, Le Mari de la reine (1889), which failed, although Messager thought it "the best of my flops".

Fin de siècle

Messager's fortunes revived in 1890 with La Basoche, produced with much success at the Opéra-Comique. The critic who had pronounced so unfavourably on Le Bourgeois de Calais wrote of the new piece, "an exceptionally pleasing work ... a dainty piece which cannot fail to obtain widespread popularity."  An English-language version was produced in London in 1891 by Richard D'Oyly Carte. The theatrical newspaper The Era said, "The Basoche is more than a success; it is a triumph", but the piece had only a modest London run of three months.  A New York production was given in 1893 but was not a success.

Messager was a dandy and a philanderer. The musical historian D. Kern Holoman describes him as "given to immaculately tailored suits emphasizing his thin frame, careful grooming with particular attention to his mustaches, fine jewelry, and spats ... a witty conversationalist with an inexhaustible store of anecdotes and bons mots" and a womaniser. In the early 1890s Edith Messager, tired of her husband's infidelities, divorced him. Shortly afterwards she became ill; her condition deteriorated, and Messager visited her daily. By the time of her death in 1892 the two had become close again, and Messager felt her loss deeply.

In 1892 Messager's career as a conductor began to advance when he was invited to conduct Die Walküre at Marseille. As a composer the early 1890s brought him mixed fortunes. Madame Chrysanthème, staged at the Théâtre de la Renaissance in 1893, was a setting of Pierre Loti's story of a betrayed geisha, a theme that later inspired Puccini's Madama Butterfly; it was politely rather than enthusiastically received. Mirette, produced by Carte at the Savoy Theatre in 1894, was Messager's first opera written expressly for the London stage and was the only original Savoy opera by a French composer. To assist him in what was for him (at the time) an unfamiliar idiom, Messager enlisted the help of the songwriter Dotie (Alice Maude) Davis (1859–1938), known professionally as Hope Temple. She became Messager's second wife in 1895. According to Bernard Shaw, Messager, concluding from the reception of La Basoche in London that it was unwise to offer the British public anything too intelligent, decided that the new opera was going to be as commonplace as possible. It ran for 41 performances, was withdrawn and revised, and then ran for another 61 performances. Messager vetoed any production in Paris. His next opera, a serious work, Le Chevalier d'Harmental (1896), was unsuccessful, and for a while he and his new wife withdrew to the English countryside near Maidenhead, Berkshire.

From 1897 Messager's career revived. He later recalled that he had received by post an unsolicited libretto:

This was the opérette Les P'tites Michu, which was presented to great acclaim at the Bouffes-Parisiens. Its 1905 English adaptation in London ran for 401 performances. Soon afterwards he was appointed musical director of the Opéra-Comique, and in the commercial theatre had another outstanding success with Véronique (1898).

In 1898 Messager's only child from his second marriage, Madeleine Hope Andrée (d. 1986) was born. From that year to 1904 Messager's work at the Opéra-Comique left him little time for composition, particularly after 1901, when he also spent May to July at the Royal Opera House in London. He turned down W. S. Gilbert's offer of a collaboration, and wrote only two stage works between 1898 and 1914. His international fame as a composer nevertheless grew, with productions of Les P'tites Michu and Véronique in countries including Britain, Spain, Switzerland, Germany and the US. Unusually for the London stage at the time, Véronique was given in French in 1903. An English translation was staged the following year and ran for 496 performances. Messager conducted the first nights of both productions. The English version was staged in New York the following year, running for 81 performances.

Twentieth century
At the Opéra-Comique, Messager conducted the premieres of Massenet's Grisélidis and Charpentier's Louise, and gave the first French performances of operas as contrasted as Hansel and Gretel and Tosca. But by far the best known of his premieres was Debussy's Pelléas et Mélisande (1902). Messager encouraged the composer to complete the opera and worked closely with him in getting the orchestration ready for the premiere. In gratitude Debussy dedicated the work to Messager. Holoman writes, "his championing of Pelléas et Mélisande alone would have earned him a place in music history." Debussy regarded Messager as the ideal conductor. Before the premiere he had trusted him to "make his dream into a reality"; after it he praised him for knowing "how to awaken the inner sound world of Pelléas with tender delicacy". After Messager's commitments obliged him to leave Paris for London, Debussy found the performances much less satisfactory. As a conductor, Messager won praise on both sides of the English Channel. The English music critic Francis Toye wrote that, good though Arturo Toscanini's conducting of Pelléas et Mélisande was at La Scala in Milan, Messager's was still better. The Parisian critic Pierre Lalo said of Messager:

From 1901 to 1907 Messager was one of the directors of the Grand Opera Syndicate, which ran the annual seasons at the Royal Opera House, Covent Garden, featuring the leading singers of the day, including Nellie Melba and Enrico Caruso. Much of his time was spent on administration, and he had limited scope for conducting. From 1901, for two years, Messager had an affair with the Scottish soprano Mary Garden, whom he met at the Opéra-Comique and conducted when she took over the title role of Louise. She also appeared in a revival of his Madame Chrysanthème. His first appearance as a conductor at Covent Garden was in 1902 for the first performance of Princess Osra by Herbert Bunning.  He next conducted there in 1904 in the British premiere of Saint-Saëns's Hélène, followed in 1905 by Carmen, Don Giovanni, Faust, the world première of Franco Leoni's L'oracolo, Orphée et Euridice and Roméo et Juliette; in his final year, 1906, he conducted Armide, Carmen, Don Giovanni, Faust, the British premiere of Le Jongleur de Notre-Dame, and Roméo et Juliette. In 1906 he also introduced to Covent Garden his ballet Les Deux Pigeons. Despite his reputation as a Wagnerian, he yielded the baton for Wagner performances to Hans Richter, widely regarded as the world's foremost exponent of Wagner's music.  In 1906 Messager and the London Symphony Orchestra travelled to Paris to play a programme of English music at the Châtelet Theatre, including works by Sullivan, Parry and Stanford. When he left Covent Garden in 1907, the directors found it necessary to appoint two people to fill his place: Neil Forsyth as general manager and Percy Pitt as musical director.

In 1907 Messager returned to composition. His "comédie lyrique" Fortunio was presented at the Opéra-Comique with great success. In the same year he was appointed joint director of the Paris Opéra, responsible for the artistic direction, with Frederick Broussan, formerly director of the Lyons Opera, taking charge of administration. The partnership lasted until 1913, but its success was hampered by shortage of funds and internal disputes. Messager decided on a policy of making the Opéra "more genuinely French". He revived Rameau's Hippolyte et Aricie, for the first time in Paris since 1767, and presented unusual French repertoire including Fauré's Pénélope. Foreign opera was not neglected; Messager gave Paris its first complete Ring cycle, presented a Russian season starring Félia Litvinne and Feodor Chaliapin, and conducted the French premiere of Richard Strauss's Salome.  At the invitation of the Emperor Wilhelm II, Messager and Broussan took the Opéra company to Berlin in 1908. Relations between the two co-directors were not always harmonious; after the French government refused Messager's resignation on at least one occasion, he finally announced it in November 1913, a year before his term of office was due to expire. He consented to return in January 1914 to conduct Parsifal – its first performance in Europe outside Bayreuth. His conducting of the work won critical praise.

On the strength of his experience as a Wagnerian, Messager was appointed conductor of the Orchestre de la Société des Concerts du Conservatoire in 1908. It was at the time, and for many years, the most prestigious symphony orchestra in France, and Messager was determined that it should enjoy the international prestige of the Vienna and Berlin Philharmonic Orchestras. Alongside the main orchestral repertoire of Haydn, Mozart, Beethoven, Liszt and French classics, Messager conducted major choral works by J. S. Bach, Handel, Schumann and Berlioz, as well as introducing early French music such as that of Janequin. In the 1913–14 season, he conducted a chronological cycle of Beethoven's symphonies and his Missa solemnis, as well as Verdi's Requiem, for the Italian composer's centenary. Messager took the orchestra outside Paris to Lille, Lyon and Antwerp during these years. During the First World War he took the orchestra on tour to Argentina (1916), Switzerland (1917), and the US and Canada (1918–19), giving concerts in more than 50 cities. After their concert at the Metropolitan Opera House in October 1918, the orchestra and Messager received a prolonged ovation that was typical of their reception as the tour progressed. At the end of that tour Messager retired from his post.

Messager was criticised for performing the music of Wagner during the war, but he maintained that German music represented the noble side of the enemy nation's nature. Like Fauré, Messager refused to have anything to do with the National League for the Defence of French Music (La Ligue Nationale pour la Defense de la Musique Française), led by Saint-Saëns, which sought to boycott German music.

In 1914 Messager composed Béatrice, described as a "légende lyrique", based on the 1911 play The Miracle. The premiere was in Monte Carlo. The work was performed in Paris in 1917 but was not successful. In 1915 Messager joined with other musicians in contributing compositions to King Albert's Book to raise money for "the relief of the suffering Belgian people"; the other composers included Debussy, Elgar, Mascagni and Saint-Saëns.

In 1919 Messager's operetta Monsieur Beaucaire was premiered in Birmingham prior to a long run in the West End. The composer, who generally conducted British premieres of his works, was suffering from sciatica and could not even be in the audience for the first nights in either city. The work received its Paris premiere at the Théâtre Marigny in 1925, and it ran for 143 performances on Broadway. Later in 1919 Messager resumed the musical directorship of the Opéra-Comique for the 1919–20 season, conducting among other works the first complete performance in France of Così fan tutte.

Last years
In the 1920s, Messager kept pace with the change in fashion in musical theatre, consciously absorbing the styles of musical comedy, lightening his orchestration, but maintaining a Gallic flavour, mostly avoiding American dance-rhythm influences. He collaborated with Sacha Guitry on the musical comedies L'Amour masqué (1923) and Deburau (1926), starring Yvonne Printemps. The former was a considerable success in Paris, but in London the official censor, the Lord Chamberlain, declared it "unfit for the English public", and banned C. B. Cochran's planned production starring Printemps and Guitry. In Messager's late stage works his lighter touch was balanced by echoes of the nineteenth century, with hints of Fauré and, particularly, Chabrier's L'Étoile. Fauré, by 1923 too frail and deaf to go to the theatre, was lent a copy of the score of L'Amour masqué and wrote to Messager, "Your wit is the same as always – it never grows old – and so are your charm and very personal brand of music that always remains exquisite even amid the broadest clowning". Fauré died the following year, and Messager dedicated the music of Deburau to his memory.

In 1924 Sergei Diaghilev persuaded Messager to conduct the Paris premieres of Auric's ballet Les Fâcheux and Poulenc's Les Biches. In 1928 Messager played a key role in establishing important updates to copyright law, though he was on the losing side of the case. He sued the BBC for breach of copyright for broadcasting his works without his consent. He lost because he had assigned his British performing rights to George Edwardes, whose estate had given the BBC permission for the broadcast. The case established that as the broadcasting rights had not been specifically reserved, the Edwardes estate's rights included them.

After a short illness Messager died in Paris on 24 February 1929 aged 75. He was interred in the Passy Cemetery near the graves of Debussy and Fauré. His last completed work, the opérette Coups de roulis, was running in Paris when he died. A contemporary critic commented, "Its tuneful melodies show that the veteran composer had lost nothing of the qualities that made Véronique such a success. Throughout his life Messager remained without a peer as a composer of light music."

Honours and awards
Messager was elected President of the Société des Auteurs et Compositeurs Dramatiques in 1926, the first composer to hold this office. In the same year he was elected to the Académie des Beaux-Arts. In 1927 he was appointed Commander of the Légion d'honneur. In his native town of Montluçon, the music academy, opened in 2009, is named in his honour. In 2003, to mark the 150th anniversary of his birth, Messager was the subject of a large exhibition at the Musée des musiques populaires de Montluçon, recounting his biography and illustrating his works in the various genres. Among the comité d'honneur of the exhibition were the composer's three grandchildren, and the singers Susan Graham, Dame Felicity Lott and Mady Mesplé, the conductors Sir John Eliot Gardiner, John Nelson and Michel Plasson, and the director Jérôme Savary.

Music

In his 1991 study of Messager, John Wagstaff writes that the composer's music is notable for its fine orchestration, easy-flowing melody, and skilfully written music, dance-like in character. Unlike his teacher Fauré, Messager enjoyed orchestrating. He said that musical ideas came to him "already clothed in the appropriate instrumental shades", and after the concentrated effort of composing his scores he found it relaxing to work on "the handling of instruments, the balancing of different sonorities, the grouping of colours and the structuring of effects". He remarked that composers who had their music orchestrated by assistants presumably did not care if their helpers lacked "that indefinable sixth sense which would indicate the right combination of sonorities to carry out the original intentions of the composer". To Messager, passages often depended for their significance or flavour on the orchestral writing alone.

Gervase Hughes, in a study of French opérette, comments that Messager's only technical defect was "one all too common to many composers of operetta – too close an adherence to repetitive rhythmic figures and four-bar rigidity", although such was Messager's "innate artistry that criticism on that score would be academic pedantry". One of the composer's distinguishing characteristics was a liking for chromaticism; this appealed to a younger generation of composers. His "Eh que ne parliez-vous?", from La Basoche, was quoted note-for-note by Poulenc in Les Mamelles de Tirésias. Although Messager greatly admired Wagner, and was a celebrated conductor of his music, he distanced himself from Wagnerian influences in his own compositions. In Madame Chrysanthème he made use of leitmotifs, and included other references to Wagner, but such examples are rare in his works.

Unlike some older contemporaries such as Saint-Saëns and Massenet,  Messager remained open to new ideas and idioms throughout his life, and his style evolved to match the spirit of the times. His biographer and former pupil Henry Février commented that from classic opéras comiques, such as La Basoche, Messager's later works, such as Les P'tites Michu and Véronique, show a difference in style, "bringing an altogether fresher approach to the genre." Towards the end of his career Messager successfully moved to "comédie musicale", the French form of musical comedy.
 
Ballets apart, Messager composed thirty works for the stage; they fall into several different, or sometimes overlapping, genres; the most numerous are opéras comiques (9), opérettes (7) and comédies musicales (3). The composer remarked late in his career:

Early stage works

Although Messager called some of his early stage works opéras comiques they have, Gervase Hughes suggests, more in common with opérette than their composer acknowledged. Nevertheless, Messager introduced adventurous modern harmonic details in his early pieces, and strove to raise the artistic standards of opérette to that of opéra comique while retaining the essential panache of the genre. Hughes finds the first stage works uneven in quality but La Fauvette du temple (1884) to contain two fine expressive duets as well as waltzes and polkas with "an Offenbach lilt". Hughes judges the next two scores, La Béarnaise and La Fauvette (both 1885), less satisfying but nonetheless at least as good as anything by Messager's older contemporaries Planquette, Serpette and Lecocq.

Wagstaff writes that the composer's most enduring work is the ballet score Les Deux Pigeons (1886). The piece is based on the fable The Two Pigeons by Jean de La Fontaine. The music is best known in the five-movement suite arranged from the full score, which includes the "Entrée de tziganes".  Messager revived the ballet in 1906 in London and in 1912 in Paris in a shortened, two-act version. In 1961 John Lanchbery revised this for Frederick Ashton's new version of the ballet, with a closing reconciliation scene from earlier music and a passage transcribed from Véronique. This was first given at Covent Garden, is revived regularly by the Royal Ballet and has been staged by such other companies as CAPAB and Australian Ballet.

Isoline (1888), a musical fairy story ("conte des fées"), is neither an opérette nor an opéra comique. Writing in 1908, Fauré called it "one of the most poetic, most expressive works that have been written in France in the last twenty years", but it made little impact. The score remained in obscurity until 1930 when Reynaldo Hahn staged the ballet section of the work at Cannes. The whole piece was revived at the Opéra-Comique in 1958; it failed again, but the ballet, unencumbered by the portentousness of the libretto, which weighs down the rest of the piece, has remained in the repertory.

1890s stage works

The decade began well for Messager with the artistic and commercial success of La Basoche (1890). Février in his André Messager: Mon Maître, Mon Ami calls it "the last of the great nineteenth-century French comic operas" ("le dernier des grands opéras-comique français du XIX siècle") and considers it of the greatest importance not only in Messager's career but in the history of French musical theatre. Hughes says it has a good claim to be the composer's masterpiece. The musicologist James Harding rates it "the best Messager had written to date ... one of his finest works". When the work was given in London, a year after its Parisian premiere, the reviewer in The Times called it, "A work of great beauty and charm", although "the influence of Die Meistersinger is felt to an extent that is almost absurd both in the bright overture and again in the procession of the guild, but elsewhere the music is as original as it is charming".

With Madame Chrysanthème (1893), a four-act "lyric comedy" with no spoken dialogue, Messager reached a turning point in his development. The crux of the plot was the same as that later used by Puccini for Madama Butterfly (1904): a young Japanese geisha wooed and then abandoned by a foreign sailor. Messager's treatment of the story was praised for its sensitivity – reviewers in the Parisian press applauded him for raising opérette to the level of "comédie lyrique" – but he was a self-critical artist, and he felt he had strayed too far in the direction of opera and away from his chosen genre. Harding suggests that the unusual seriousness of the score may be connected with the recent illness and death of Edith Messager. Both Hughes and Harding comment that Messager's score is subtler than Puccini's, but add that the almost total eclipse of Madame Chrysanthème by Madama Butterfly may be partly due to the relative effectiveness of their libretti. After this, Messager consciously simplified his style, greatly reducing the harmonic subtleties that had been characteristic of his earlier works.

The works from the middle of the decade were unsuccessful financially and artistically. Le Chevalier d'Harmental (1896), classed by Hughes as Messager's first true opéra comique ("in a somewhat pretentious style") was a failure, and an unpretentious opérette in the same year, La Fiancée en loterie, fared no better. After these disappointments Messager finished the 1890s with two considerable successes. Traubner describes Les P'tites Michu (1897) as "a sensational hit", and Harding calls it the best of Messager's opérettes so far (classing Le Basoche as opéra comique, as did its composer). The plot was not strikingly original: critics commented that its story of babies switched at birth was already very familiar from Gilbert and Sullivan operas. Traubner describes the piece as "one of those unusual works that begin well enough and gets better and better". Setting a scene in the market of Les Halles was not innovative, but Messager's chorus for the marchands and marchandes was out of the ordinary, and Traubner also singles out the duet for the Michus in Act 1: "clever, lilting ... pulsating with an elegance and grace that other operetta composers have failed to obtain". He also judges the finales as outstanding, including a waltz number that in other hands would be predictable but is turned by Messager into something much more symphonic.

The final work from the decade was Véronique. Messager described it as an opéra comique, but commentators have classed it as a mixture of opérette and opéra comique. The score contains two of the composer's best known numbers, the "Swing duet" ("Poussez, poussez l'escarpolette") and the "Donkey duet" ("De ci, de la"). When the work was revived at the Proms in London in the 1960s, the music critic of The Times commented, "Charming as it can prove in the theatre, the music alone is a little thin, with none of the piquancy that – thanks perhaps to Gilbert – redeems Messager's famous English contemporary Sullivan ... but Véronique has plenty of pretty things". It became and has remained the composer's most performed musical theatre piece.

20th century

Messager's work running opera houses in Paris and London limited his composing between Véronique and the period after the First World War. Fortunio (1907) was a rare example in his oeuvre of a sung-through opera. Eight decades later the critic Edward Greenfield described it as "a long-buried jewel of a piece ... an improbable cross between musical comedy and Tristan und Isolde". From 1919 onwards Messager composed no more opéras comiques. Among his post-war stage works, Monsieur Beaucaire, a "romantic operetta" (1919), was his second work to an English libretto. French critics were inclined to look down on "Messager's English operetta" as over-sweet and sentimental to suit Anglo-Saxon tastes. Harding comments that the composer was successful in his attempt to produce an English flavour: one number is "pure Edward German" and there is much pastiche throughout the score. Despite the critics the piece ran well not only in Britain and the US, but also in France, with more than 300 performances in Paris and a long life in French provincial theatres.

Of Messager's 1920s comédies musicales the best known is L'Amour masqué (1923). The Théâtre Édouard VII where it was premiered had a small orchestra pit, and Messager developed a new style of orchestration to deliver his desired musical effects with a small number of players. Harding comments that the piece was up-to-date enough to include a tango, "a beautifully written example with luscious harmonies that by contrast show up the threadbare nature of most other efforts of the time".

Non-stage works and role in French music

Messager wrote songs for solo voice with piano throughout his career. Like Fauré, he was fond of the poetry of Armand Sylvestre, and from "La Chanson des cerises" in 1882 to the cycle Amour d'hiver in 1911 he set thirteen of Sylvestre's poems. Others whose verse he set ranged widely, from Victor Hugo to Frederic Weatherly (author of among other things "Danny Boy").

In his old age Messager said that he would have liked to write more concert works, but had never had the opportunity. The Symphony in A, written when he was 22, is on the normal classical plan with sonata form in the first and last movements, a songlike theme in the adagio and a scherzo third movement. Looking back he described it as "très classique". In notes to a 1992 recording of the piece, Xavier Deletang comments that although the influence of Mendelssohn and possibly Schumann may be discernible, the work reveals a mastery of instrumentation and a quintessentially French flavour, particularly in the wind parts. The two main subjects of the Allegro con moto first movement are strongly contrasted, with the opening string theme followed by a chorale-like theme for the winds.

When Messager was elected to membership of the Académie des Beaux-Arts in 1926 the influential musical journal Le Ménestrel remarked that this conferred on his chosen genre – opérette – official status and recognition; but his fame as a composer of light music has tended to obscure his considerable standing in contemporary serious musical circles. It was said of him that he had "seen all, heard all, and remembered all". The leading composers of the time valued his friendship and advice. Fauré called him "familiar with everything, knowing it all, fascinated by anything new". Messager's younger colleague, the composer Reynaldo Hahn, wrote, "I do believe that no musician has ever loved music as much as André Messager did. In any case, it would be impossible to have a greater musical curiosity than he did, up to the end of his life, too." Like Fauré, Messager wrote musical criticism for Le Figaro and other publications in the first decades of the 20th century. Unlike Fauré, who was known for his kindly reviews, Messager was frequently severe. His views carried weight: some of his criticisms were reported in the international press.

In 1908 Fauré wrote of Messager, "There are not many examples in the history of music of an artist with such a complete education, of such profound knowledge, who consents to apply his gifts to forms regarded, nobody knows why, as secondary". Baker's Biographical Dictionary of Musicians says of Messager, "His style may be described as enlightened eclecticism; his music was characteristically French, and more specifically Parisian, in its elegance and gaiety." In his book Composers of Operetta, Hughes comments that Messager combined "a flow of spontaneous melody worthy of Offenbach with a flair for economic workmanship at least the equal of Lecocq's" and in much of his music "a measure of Massenet's fluent grace, Saint-Saëns's aristocratic elegance, even Fauré's refined subtlety". He observes that Messager spanned an entire era: "Auber, Rossini and Meyerbeer were still alive when he began his studies, yet he survived the First World War and witnessed the rise and decline of "les Six". ... For forty years he carried aloft the torch kindled by Adolphe Adam in 1834; after his death it soon flickered out".

Conductor

The wide range of Messager's musical sympathies was noted by Le Menéstral, which said that he "has served Wagner, Debussy, Fauré, Ravel and Stravinsky when their works were still struggling for recognition". He was widely admired as a conductor. He avoided extravagant gesturing on the podium; Harding records, "His manner was precise and undemonstrative. The baton flicked neatly here and there in a way that meant little to the audience behind him but conveyed volumes to the orchestra". The music critic Pierre Lalo wrote that under Messager's direction, Parsifal, without losing any of its grandeur, "assumed a French clarity, and a sobriety, nobility and order ... even the most famous Bayreuth conductors have not always been able to do this." Not everyone shared Lalo's view; some audience members equated undemonstrativeness with dullness: Reynaldo Hahn commented, "[Messager] is not a master of the theatre ["chef du théâtre"], being too exclusively musical; he sets too much store by detail without feeling the spirit of the public behind him, and does not understand the variable musical flow that makes one hold one's breath, sigh and wait." Nevertheless, Hahn admired Messager as an orchestral conductor:
 André Messager is the most French of conductors; I mean that in this art he embodies sharpness. Grace and clarity are not uniquely French qualities: they are frequently found among the Italians and even some Germans. But sharpness is a French virtue, and nothing but French. M. André Messager has it to an exceptional degree, and it shows in how he writes, orchestrates, dresses, talks, and plays the piano. But it is when he conducts the orchestra that what one might call his organic sharpness shows itself most forcefully.

Recordings
In 1918 Messager conducted recordings in New York, with the Orchestre de la Société des Concerts du Conservatoire, of Les Chasseresses and Cortège de Bacchus from Sylvia by Delibes, Sérénade and Mules from Impressions d'Italie by Charpentier, the Bacchanale from Samson et Dalila and the Prelude to Le Déluge, both by Saint-Saëns, and 4½-minute extracts from Capriccio espagnol by Rimsky-Korsakov and Le Rouet d'Omphale by Saint-Saëns. In Wagstaff's 1991 study of Messager, the list of recordings of the composer's music runs to 40 pages; 24 of his works are represented in the list of recordings up to that date.

Complete operas
Complete recordings exist of several of Messager's stage works. There are three complete sets of Véronique – a 1953 mono recording for the Société française du son conducted by Pierre Dervaux, a 1969 stereo EMI recording conducted by Jean-Claude Hartemann, and a 1998 recording sung in English, conducted by J. Lynn Thompson. Other complete sets include L'Amour masqué (1970; conductor, Raymond Legrand), La Basoche (1960; Tony Aubin), Coups de roulis (1963; Marcel Cariven), Fortunio (1987; John Eliot Gardiner), Isoline (1947; Louis Beydts), Monsieur Beaucaire (1958; Jules Gressier), Passionnément (1964; Jean-Paul Kreder; and 2021; Armando Noguera); and Les p'tites Michu (2019; Pierre Dumoussaud).

Individual numbers
Singers who have recorded individual numbers by Messager include role creators such as Jean Périer (Véronique), Lucien Fugère (La Basoche), Pierre Darmant and Yvonne Printemps (L'Amour masqué), Koval (Passionnément), Marcelle Denya (Coups de roulis), and Maggie Teyte (Monsieur Beaucaire), as well as other contemporaries – Aino Ackté, Emma Eames, and John McCormack – whose recordings have been reissued on compact disc. Singers of the next generation who recorded Messager numbers included Georges Thill and Ninon Vallin. More recent examples include Mady Mesplé, Susan Graham, and Felicity Lott.

Non-operatic recordings
Of Messager's non-operatic works, his Messe des pêcheurs de Villerville, written jointly with Fauré, has been recorded by, among others, Harmonia Mundi, conducted by Philippe Herreweghe (1989). Messager's other collaboration with Fauré, the Wagner send-up Souvenirs de Bayreuth, has been recorded by piano duettists including Kathryn Stott and Martin Roscoe (1995, Hyperion), and, in an orchestral arrangement, by the orchestra of the Bayreuth Festival. A suite from Les Deux Pigeons has been recorded several times, for example by the Orchestra of the Royal Opera House, Covent Garden, conducted by Hugo Rignold (1948) and by Charles Mackerras (1958); in 1993 Decca recorded the complete score with the Orchestra of Welsh National Opera conducted by Richard Bonynge. His ballet-pantomime Scaramouche was recorded by the Toulon Opera orchestra under Guillaume Tourniaire (2018). The Symphony in A has been recorded by the Orchestre Symphonique du Mans, conducted by José-André Gendille (2001).

List of works

Stage works (except ballets)

Ballets 
Single act, except where shown
Fleur d'oranger 1878
Les Vins de France 1879
Mignons et vilains 1879
Les Deux Pigeons (2 acts) 1886
Scaramouche (2 acts) 1891 (with Georges Street)
Amants éternels 1893
 Le Procès des roses 1896
Le Chevalier aux fleurs 1897 (with Raoul Pugno)
Une aventure de la Guimard 1900

Orchestral
Symphony in A major 1875
Loreley, ballade for orchestra, c. 1880

Chamber and instrumental
3 valses, piano 4 hands (1884)
"Souvenirs de Bayreuth", piano 4 hands, with Gabriel Fauré, c. 1888
For solo piano (1889):
Impromptu, Op.10
Habañera, Op.11
Menuet, Op.12
Mazurka, Op.13
Caprice polka, Op.14
Valse, Op.15
"Pavane des fées"
Trois pièces, violin and piano (1897): Barcarolle, Mazurka, Sérénade
Solo de concours, clarinet and piano (1899)

Choral
Don Juan et Haydée (Byron), cantata,  c. 1875
Prométhée enchaîné (Georges Clerc), cantata, c. 1877
Messe des pêcheurs de Villerville, with Gabriel Fauré, 1881, for choir with solo violin and harmonium; orchestral accompaniment added 1882.

Songs
For solo voice with orchestral accompaniment
Sérénade (Louis Legendre), written for the play Colibri, 1889
For solo voice with piano accompaniment
"Regret d'avril" (Armand Silvestre) (1882)
"Chanson de ma mie" (Théodore de Banville) (1882)
"Mimosa" (Armand Silvestre) (1882)
"Nouveau printemps" (Heinrich Heine, translated by Georges Clerc), 5 songs (1885), dedicated to Fauré
"Gavotte" – danse chantée (Théodore de Banville) (1887)
"Chanson mélancolique" (Catulle Mendès) (1889)
"La Chanson des cerises" (Armand Silvestre) (1889)
"Neige rose" (Armand Silvestre) (1889)
"Fleurs d'hiver" (Armand Silvestre) (1889)
"O canto do Paris n'America" (unnamed) (1890)
"À une fiancée" (Victor Hugo) (1891)
"Arioso" (Paul Burani) (1891)
"Ritournelle" (Henry Gauthier-Villars) (1894)
"Chanson d'automne" (Paul Delair) (1894)
"Chant d'amour" (Armand Silvestre) (1894)
"Le Bateau rose" (Jean Richepin) (1894)
"Douce chanson" (Émile Blémont) (1894)
"Notre amour" (Armand Silvestre) (1896)
"Aimons nous" (Emile Blémont) (1897)
"Curly Locks" (Frederic Weatherly) (1897)
"Amour d'hiver" (Armand Silvestre), 6 songs (1911)
"Pour la patrie" (Victor Hugo) (1914)
"La Paix de blanc vêtue" (Léon Lahovary) (1922)
"Va chercher quelques fleurs" (Louis Aufauvre) (1922)

Source: Grove Dictionary of Music and Musicians; L'académie nationale de l'opérette; and Wagstaff: André Messager.

Notes, references and sources

Notes

References

Sources
 
 
 
 
 
 
  
 
 
        
 
 
 
 
 
 
 
 
  
 
  
 
 
 
 
  
 
  
 
 
 
 
 
Volume II: 
Volume III:

Further reading

External links

 List of stage works by Messager at The Guide to Light Opera and Operetta
 List of works by Messager at the Index to Opera and Ballet Sources Online
 
 
 Video feature on The Two Pigeons at The Royal Ballet
 Video feature on Solo de concours

 
1853 births
1929 deaths
Burials at Passy Cemetery
Commandeurs of the Légion d'honneur
French ballet composers
French male conductors (music)
French conductors (music)
French male classical composers
French opera composers
Male opera composers
French operetta composers
Members of the Académie des beaux-arts
Music directors (opera)
Directors of the Paris Opera
People associated with Gilbert and Sullivan
People from Montluçon
Pupils of Camille Saint-Saëns